Ian Kochinski (born February 14, 1994), better known as Vaush (formerly VaushVidya), is an American  left-wing YouTuber and Twitch streamer known for debating and discussing politics online from a  libertarian socialist perspective.

Early life 
Ian Kochinski was born on February 14, 1994, in Los Angeles, California. He is of Irish and Polish descent. Kochinski studied sociology at Humboldt State University, graduating with a Bachelor of Arts degree in 2018.

Career 
Kochinski is best known for his livestreamed debates with far-right figures such as Stefan Molyneux and Sargon of Akkad, which have millions of views. His first appearances online were in discussions with the political streamer Destiny, and encouraged by Destiny's audience he later began a Twitch channel of his own. Kochinski felt that other members of the online left at the time were too academic to reach the demographic of insecure white men that he thought was most susceptible to online radicalization and he opted to instead create loud, angry content that he thought would be more likely to appeal to them. While appealing to what he calls "masculine tendencies", Kochinski has aimed to create an inclusive community and has comparatively high proportions of women, and gay and trans people in his audience.

Kochinski mimicks the style of right-wing YouTubers and utilizes similar video titles so that his videos are suggested by recommendation algorithms to those at risk of radicalization, a common strategy employed by the left-wing BreadTube community on YouTube. He also uses memes and internet slang in his videos to appeal to the audience of primarily young people online. His content features himself discussing news events and contentious issues, and debating other political streamers from the left and right, often in a confrontational style aimed at making his opponent appear unintelligent and often utilizing the research skills and knowledge he gained from his sociology education to back up his arguments. However, when engaging with conspiracy theorists, Kochinski generally does not spend much time on research or debunking debated topics, as he believes that taking a more amiable approach is better at influencing people away from such hardened views. His channel also features discussions and debates with offline figures, including journalists, radio hosts, and political candidates.

In 2019, he was banned from Twitch for saying that the US should invade Israel in defense of Palestinians, an incident which he later described as himself "going too far criticising Israeli imperialism". As a result, he transitioned to YouTube as his main platform, after having created his YouTube channel that January. In June 2019, Kochinski debated conservative YouTuber Hunter Avallone. Avallone later said "I got wrecked in [that] debate" and subsequent to the debate his views took a leftward turn resulting in a video titled "Why I Left The Right". In December 2021, Kochinski was again banned from Twitch indefinitely for using the racial epithet "cracker" on stream. He used the term while discussing whether it could be considered a racial slur and if saying it should be a bannable offense following the ban of fellow Twitch streamer Hasan Piker for saying the word on stream. In response to the ban, Kochinski told The Washington Post that social media platforms are "terrible at acknowledging context and power relations when it comes to harassment."

Reception 
Online, Kochinski is seen as a controversial figure. In 2021, controversy on Twitter surrounding Vaush was prompted by the reemergence of videos in which he justified his past uses of the "N-word" and argued that the word is acceptable in certain contexts. Responding to the controversy on his livestream, Kochinski said that earlier statements that he had made had been a failed attempt at being "overly edgy" and that he "no longer stand[s] by" his arguments justifying the use of the n-word.

Later in 2021, his arguments that kink should be excluded from some pride events for not being family-friendly and for making pride inaccessible to young questioning queer people were met with divided opinions on social media and criticism from writers for Vox, The Mary Sue, and The Bulwark. Also in 2021, Kochinski received praise from Kotaku for a charity livestream in which he raised over $200,000 for the Palestine Children's Relief Fund and from The Daily Beast for challenging Tim Pool on the meaning of critical race theory while appearing on his podcast Timcast IRL. He was also positively cited by Communication & Media Studies Professor Tanner Mirrlees as an example of a leftist livestreamer who "demolishes [alt-right YouTubers'] bad arguments, even humiliating them in front of like 70,000 viewers in real time" and by sociologist Anthony Knowles for successfully communicating sociological ideas to a large audience outside of the reach of academic sociologists.

Political views 
Kochinski is a self-described progressive, anti-fascist, and libertarian socialist. He has also described himself as a "dirtbag leftist" and "a big fan of democracy". In the 2020 United States presidential election, he opposed the "Bernie or Bust" movement and urged people to vote for Joe Biden, calling a refusal to vote "stupid" and motivated by "[an] incredibly narcissistic 'doomerism' that prevents people from engaging in meaningful action". Kochinski opposes the United States embargo against Cuba and supported the withdrawal of United States troops from Afghanistan. He also opposed Donald Trump's withdrawal of United States troops from Rojava. While believing that tech companies have too much power, Kochinski also felt that Donald Trump being banned from various social media websites was an "unequivocally good thing". In 2022, Kochinski posted multiple videos and broadcast multiple livestreams condemning the Russian invasion of Ukraine.

Kochinski has criticized the online right for creating a "pipeline" that pushes people to radical hard-right views such as ethnic nationalism and disenfranchising women, and for engaging in "absolute abject cruelty to trans people". He has also criticized the online left for "purity politics" and for engaging in actions that create "great content but terrible political advocacy". Nonetheless, he believes that the left should engage in online advocacy because the internet allows for their message to reach a wider audience than any other medium and has argued that BreadTube has decreased the number of people online moving to the political right. Following the arrest of manosphere influencer Andrew Tate, Vaush argued that Tate's rise to popularity was due to the left failing to address the problems of young men and boys, saying they were being "pulled into fascism" because "the right talks to them and the left doesn't".

In May 2021, he opposed Twitch's use of the term "womxn", saying "There is already an inclusive term for trans women and cis women, and it's women... The only reason you [would not] believe that is if you don't believe trans women are women." He has criticized Twitter for banning trans people for using the term TERF, which he argues is "categorically not a slur".

Personal life 
Kochinski identifies as pansexual, and has attention deficit hyperactivity disorder. He is also on the autism spectrum.

See also  
BreadTube

References

External links 

 
 

1994 births
Living people
20th-century American LGBT people
21st-century American LGBT people
Activists from Los Angeles
American YouTubers
American anti-fascists
American people of Irish descent
American people of Polish descent
American socialists
California State Polytechnic University, Humboldt alumni
California socialists
Entertainers from Los Angeles
LGBT YouTubers
American LGBT rights activists
Libertarian socialists
Pansexual entertainers
Progressivism in the United States
Transgender rights activists
Twitch (service) streamers
Washington (state) socialists
YouTube controversies
People with attention deficit hyperactivity disorder
People on the autism spectrum